Hepatology is a peer-reviewed medical journal of hepatology. It is published monthly by John Wiley & Sons on behalf of the American Association for the Study of Liver Diseases. The journal was established in 1981 and the editor-in-chief is David E Cohen (Weill Cornell Medical).

Indexing and abstracting
The journal is abstracted and indexed in the following databases:

According to Journal Citation Reports, the journal's 2020 impact factor is 17.425, ranking it 6th out of 92 journals in the category "Gastroenterology & Hepatology".

References

External links

American Association for the Study of Liver Diseases

Gastroenterology and hepatology journals
Wiley (publisher) academic journals
English-language journals
Monthly journals
Publications established in 1981